TICRA (name derived from the last syllable of the first word and first syllable of the second word in Electromagnetic radiation) is a small company in Copenhagen, Denmark specializing in antenna analysis and synthesis software. Their signature software includes:
GRASP (General Reflector Antenna Software Package):
POS (Physical Optics-based Shaped reflector)
CHAMP (Corrugated Horn Analysis by Modal Processing)
Their software is regarded as the de facto industry standard.

References

External links

Software companies of Denmark
Software companies based in Copenhagen
Companies based in Copenhagen Municipality